The BBC Sports Personality of the Year 2021 took place on 19 December 2021 at the dock10 studios in Salford.

The event was broadcast live on BBC One.

Nominees
The nominees for the award were revealed on 13 December 2021.

Other awards
In addition to the main award as "Sports Personality of the Year", several other awards were also announced:

Team of the Year: England national football team
Coach of the Year: Gareth Southgate
Lifetime Achievement: Simone Biles
World Sport Star: Rachael Blackmore
Young Sports Personality of the Year: Sky Brown
Unsung Hero: Sam Barlow
Helen Rollason Award: Jen Beattie

In Memoriam

Ian St John
Jimmy Greaves
Ray Kennedy
Colin Bell
Ron Flowers
Barbara Inkpen
Manolo Santana
Paul Nihill
Brian London
Sebastian Eubank 
Leon Spinks
Marvelous Marvin Hagler
Frank Worthington
Glenn Roeder
Paul Mariner
Roger Hunt
Lloyd Cowan
Ron Hill
Dorothy Manley
Alan Hart
Kevin Gearey
Lance Hardy
Jeanette Altwegg
David Jenkins
Simon Terry
Doug Mountjoy
Max Mosley
Bertie Auld 
Lee Elder
Eileen Ash
John Edrich
Ted Dexter
Walter Smith
Jim McLean
Tommy Docherty
Andy Fordham
David Heaton
George Monaghan
James Muirhead
Gerd Muller
Mike Smith
Dai Davies
Gillian Sheen
David Rose
Jeff Grayshon
Siobhan Cattigan
Julie Chipchase
Peter Lorimer
Terry Cooper
Jacques Rogge
Gerald Sinstadt
Renton Laidlaw
Steve Docherty
Sabine Schmitz
Lorna Brooke
Trevor Hemmings
Joe Mercer
John Pullin
Sandy Carmichael
John Dawes
Frank Williams
Murray Walker

References

External links
Official website

BBC Sports Personality of the Year awards
BBC Sports Personality of the Year Award
Bbc
BBC Sports Personality of the Year Award
BBC Sports Personality of the Year Award
BBC